Paolo Moreno (30 October 1934 – 5 March 2021) was an Italian archeologist, art historian, and university professor.

Biography
Born in Udine in 1934, Moreno graduated from the University of Bari. He then attended the Italian School of Archaeology at Athens and the Scuola Nazionale di Archeologia. During his academic career, he directed the Institute of Archeology at the University of Bari and became a lecturer on ancient art at Roma Tre University. He wrote several hundred studies on ancient art.

Paolo Moreno died in Rome on 5 March 2021 at the age of 86.

Publications
Vita e arte di Lisippo (1987)
Pittura greca, Da Polignoto ad Apelle (1987)
Lisippo. L'arte e la fortuna (1995)
Apelle. La battaglia di Alessandro (2000)
I Bronzi di Riace. Il Maestro di Olimpia e i Sette a Tebe (2002)
Il genio differente, Alla scoperta della maniera antica (2002)
I marmi antichi della Galleria Borghese, La collezione archeologica di Camillo e Francesco Borghese (2003)
Alessandro Magno (2004)
La bellezza classica, Guida al piacere dell'antico (2008)

References

1934 births
2021 deaths
Italian archaeologists
People from Udine
University of Bari alumni